Patrick Penn is an American politician serving as a member of the Kansas House of Representatives from the 85th district. Elected in November 2020, he assumed office on January 11, 2021.

Early life and education 
Penn was raised in the foster care system. After leaving the Army, Penn earned a Bachelor of Science degree in criminology from Colorado State University and a Master of Science in applied information technology from the Volgenau School of Engineering of George Mason University.

Career 
After graduating from high school, he joined the United States Army, where he was deployed to Iraq and Afghanistan. Prior to entering politics, Penn worked for Textron Aviation Defense. Penn was elected to the Kansas House of Representatives in November 2020 and assumed office on January 11, 2021. Penn defeated incumbent Michael Capps in the Republican primary.  New Politics describes him as a Christian Conservative.

During the 2021 legislative session, Penn served on the following House Committees:

 Federal and State Affairs
 K-12 Education Budget
 Children and Seniors.

References 

Living people
Republican Party members of the Kansas House of Representatives
African-American state legislators in Kansas
Colorado State University alumni
George Mason University alumni
People from Wichita, Kansas
21st-century American politicians
United States Army officers
Year of birth missing (living people)
21st-century African-American politicians
Conservatism in the United States